Padina is a commune in Buzău County, Muntenia, Romania. It is composed of a single village, Padina. It formerly included Tătulești village, now depopulated.

The commune is located in the Bărăgan Plain, in the extreme southeast of the county, on the border with Brăila County and Ialomița County. It is crossed by the national road DN2C that connects Buzău with Slobozia; county road DJ203E branches off from here, connecting Padina with Rușețu.

Notes

Communes in Buzău County
Localities in Muntenia